Jahir Alejandro Barraza Flores (born 17 September 1990) is a Mexican professional footballer who plays as a forward for Salvadoran Primera División club Santa Tecla.

Biography
Born in Delicias, Chihuahua, Barraza started his career at Dorados Fuerzas Basicas of Tercera División de México. In 2008–09 season he was signed by Atlas and joined their Filial Team Académicos, at Primera División A, Atlas B Team at Segunda División and C team at Tercera División. He made his Primera A debut, on January 17, 2009, in a 1–1 tie with Albinegros de Orizaba.

After the fold of Académicos team, in 2009–10 season he played for Atlas B at Segunda División and Fuerzas Basicas U20 Team at Fuerzas Basicas U20 League (Which Atlas had team played from 2nd division to 7 division). In the Copa MX Apertura 2013, Barraza was the top scorer.

On 15 January 2019, Barraza joined San Antonio FC of the USL Championship. However, San Antonio and Barraza mutually agreed to terminate the loan after just one-month at the club. After a trial at FF Jaro in Finland, he signed a one-year loan deal on 10 April 2019.

U-23 International appearances 
As of 22 February 2012

U-23 International Goals 

|-
| 1. || 22 February 2012 || Ciudad Nezahualcóyotl, Mexico ||  Toros Neza || 2–0|| 4–2 || Friendly
|-

References

External links
 
  
 
 
 

1990 births
Living people
Association football midfielders
Footballers from Chihuahua
Mexican expatriate footballers
Liga MX players
Ascenso MX players
USL Championship players
Ykkönen players
Dorados de Sinaloa footballers
Atlas F.C. footballers
Leones Negros UdeG footballers
Club Necaxa footballers
San Luis F.C. players
San Antonio FC players
FF Jaro players
Cimarrones de Sonora players
Mexican expatriate sportspeople in the United States
Mexican expatriate sportspeople in Finland
Expatriate soccer players in the United States
Expatriate footballers in Finland
People from Delicias, Chihuahua
Mexican footballers